Loopified is the debut album by Swedish band Dirty Loops. It was released in Japan on April 16, in the UK on May 19, and in the US August 19, 2014.

Track listing

American release
The American release omitted the last two songs and included three covers that the band posted as videos on YouTube before the album was produced:

Personnel
Personnel adapted from Loopified liner notes
Dirty Loops
Jonah Nilsson - vocals, keyboards
Henrik Linder - bass guitar
Aron Mellergard - drums
Additional personnel
Jerry Hey - arrangements, band leader
Filip Jers - harmonica
Erik Lidbom - keyboards, synthesizer
Andreas Ekstedt - percussion
Dan Higgins - saxophone
Nisse Westfelt - tambourine
Bill Reichenbach - trombone
Gary Grant - trumpet
Wayne Bergeron - trumpet

References

2014 debut albums
Jazz fusion albums by Swedish artists